Chen Shu-hui is a member of the Kuomintang and a former member of the Legislative Yuan in Taiwan.

References

See also

 Eighth Legislative Yuan

Living people
Kuomintang Members of the Legislative Yuan in Taiwan
1957 births
Members of the 7th Legislative Yuan
Members of the 8th Legislative Yuan
21st-century Taiwanese women politicians